Waitzkin is a surname. Notable people with the surname include:

Fred Waitzkin (born 1943), American novelist and writer, father of Josh (see below)
Howard Waitzkin (born 1945), sociologist
Joshua Waitzkin (born 1976), American chess player, martial arts competitor, and author, son of Fred (see above)
Stella Waitzkin (1920–2003), American installation artist